Stilbus is a genus of beetles commonly called the shining flower beetles belonging to the family Phalacridae.

Species
Species within this genus include:

 Stilbus abbreviatus  Casey, 1916 
 Stilbus aequalis  (Sharp, 1888) 
 Stilbus ambagiosus  Lyubarsky, 2003 
 Stilbus angulatus  Champion, 1925 
 Stilbus angulicaput  (Scott, 1922) 
 Stilbus angustus  Casey, 1916 
 Stilbus apertus  Casey, 1916 
 Stilbus apicalis  (Melsh.) 
 Stilbus apicialis  (Melsheimer, 1844) 
 Stilbus aquatilis  (LeConte, 1856) 
 Stilbus atomarius  (Linnaeus, 1767) 
 Stilbus attenuatus  Casey, 1890 
 Stilbus avunculus  Flach, 1889 
 Stilbus belfragei  Casey, 1916 
 Stilbus bipustulatus  Champion, 1925 
 Stilbus borealis  (Guillebeau, 1894) 
 Stilbus brevisternus  (Guillebeau, 1893) 
 Stilbus cinctus  Fauvel, 1903 
 Stilbus compactus  Lyubarsky, 2003 
 Stilbus convergens  Casey, 1890 
 Stilbus coxalis  Svec, 1992 
 Stilbus curvolineatus  Champion, 1924 
 Stilbus daublebskyorum  Svec, 2003 
 Stilbus dollmani  Champion, 1925 
 Stilbus ferrugineus  Svec, 1992 
 Stilbus fidelis  Casey, 1916 
 Stilbus finitimus  Casey, 1916 
 Stilbus floridanus  Casey, 1890 
 Stilbus galvestonicus  Casey, 1916 
 Stilbus gossypii  (Brèthes, 1912) 
 Stilbus gracilis  (Sharp, 1888) 
 Stilbus guillebeaui  Hetschko, 1928 
 Stilbus japonicus  Svec, 1992 
 Stilbus koltzei  Reitter, 1887 
 Stilbus libidinosus  Lyubarsky, 2003 
 Stilbus limbatus  Casey, 1916 
 Stilbus ludibundus  Casey, 1916 
 Stilbus ludovicianus  Casey, 1916 
 Stilbus merkli  Svec, 1992 
 Stilbus misellus  (Guillebeau, 1894) 
 Stilbus modestus  Casey, 1890 
 Stilbus mollis  (Sharp, 1888) 
 Stilbus nanulus  Casey, 1890 
 Stilbus nitidus  (Melsheimer, 1844) 
 Stilbus notabilis  (Fall, 1901) 
 Stilbus oblongus  (Erichson, 1845) 
 Stilbus obscurus  Casey, 1890 
 Stilbus obtusus  (LeConte, 1856) 
 Stilbus ochraceus  Casey, 1916 
 Stilbus olearis  Lyubarsky, 2003 
 Stilbus orbicularis  Lyubarsky, 2003 
 Stilbus pallidus  Casey, 1890 
 Stilbus pannonicus  Franz, 1968 
 Stilbus placidus  (Sharp, 1888) 
 Stilbus probatus  Casey, 1916 
 Stilbus prudens  Casey, 1916 
 Stilbus pubicoxis  (Guillebeau, 1893) 
 Stilbus pusillus  (LeConte, 1856) 
 Stilbus quadrisetosus  Casey, 1916 
 Stilbus semirufus  Guillebeau, 1894 
 Stilbus seriatus  (Guillebeau, 1894) 
 Stilbus sharpi  (Guillebeau, 1892) 
 Stilbus shastanicus  Casey, 1916 
 Stilbus simplex  Lyubarsky, 1998 
 Stilbus sphaericulus  Casey, 1916 
 Stilbus sternosetosus  (Lyubarsky, 1998) 
 Stilbus subalutaceus  Casey, 1890 
 Stilbus sublineatus  (Guillebeau, 1894) 
 Stilbus substriatus  (Guillebeau, 1894) 
 Stilbus testaceus  (Panzer, 1797) 
 Stilbus thoracicus  Casey, 1916 
 Stilbus trisetosus  Casey, 1916 
 Stilbus truncatus  Svec, 1992 
 Stilbus univestis  (Guillebeau, 1894) 
 Stilbus viduus  Casey, 1890 
 Stilbus zotti  Svec, 2003

References

Phalacridae